Aspergillus germanicus is a species of fungus in the genus Aspergillus which has been isolated from indoor air in Germany. It is from the Usti section.

Growth and morphology

A. germanicus has been cultivated on both Czapek yeast extract agar (CYA) plates and Malt Extract Agar Oxoid® (MEAOX) plates. The growth morphology of the colonies can be seen in the pictures below.

References

Further reading
 

germanicus
Fungi described in 2011